East Okement is a river in the Dartmoor moors in Devon in south-west England. It joins the West Okement at Okehampton to form the Okement.

References

Rivers of Devon
Dartmoor
2EastOkement